A Boy and a Girl (Italian: Un ragazzo e una ragazza) is a 1983 Italian romantic comedy film directed by Marco Risi.

Cast 
Jerry Calà as Calogero Bertoletti
Marina Suma as Anna De Rosa
Sandro Ghiani as Mario
Monica Scattini as Carmen 
Francesca Ventura as Matilde 
Serena Grandi as Prostitute

See also  
 List of Italian films of 1983

References

External links

1983 films
Italian romantic comedy films
1983 romantic comedy films
Films directed by Marco Risi
Films scored by Manuel De Sica
1980s Italian-language films
1980s Italian films